Natasha Myers is an associate professor of anthropology at York University. In 2016 she coined the term "Planthroposcene". Her first book, Rendering Life Molecular: Models, Modelers, and Excitable Matter is an ethnography of protein crystallographers and discusses how scientists teach one another how to sense the molecular realm. This book won the 2016 Robert Merton Book Prize from the Science, Knowledge, and Technology Section of the American Sociological Association. She received her BSc in biology from McGill University, a Masters in Environmental Studies from York University's Faculty of Environmental Studies and her PhD in the Program in History, Anthropology, and Science, Technology & Society (HASTS) at the Massachusetts Institute of Technology.

References 

Living people
McGill University Faculty of Science alumni
York University alumni
Academic staff of York University
Massachusetts Institute of Technology alumni
Canadian anthropologists
Canadian women anthropologists
Science and technology studies scholars
1974 births